Anna Smashnova-Pistolesi was the defending champion, but lost in second round to Marta Domachowska.

Flavia Pennetta won the title by defeating Klára Koukalová 7–5, 3–6, 6–3 in the final.

Seeds
The first two seeds received a bye into the second round.

Draw

Finals

Top half

Bottom half

References
 Main and Qualifying Draws

Orange Warsaw Open
2004 WTA Tour